Bob Friend (born December 5, 1963) is an American professional golfer who played on the PGA Tour and the Nationwide Tour.

Golfing career
Friend joined the Ben Hogan Tour (now Nationwide Tour) in 1990 and recorded five top-10 finished including a second-place finish at the Ben Hogan El Paso Open during his rookie year on Tour. The following year he won the Ben Hogan Fort Wayne Open and earned his PGA Tour card for 1992 through qualifying school. In his rookie year on Tour he didn't play well enough to retain full-time status on Tour but his 137th-place finish gave him partial status. He split time between Tours in 1993 with the highlights of his year coming on the Nationwide Tour where he recorded a second-place finish and a tied for third finish. He played full-time on the Nationwide Tour in 1994 where he recorded five top-10 finishes and two third-place finishes. He struggled in 1995 but recorded two top-10 finishes. He didn't play on Tour in 1996 and returned to the Nationwide Tour in 1997 where he recorded three top-10 finishes. He returned to the PGA Tour in 1998, earning his card through qualifying school. He played very well during his second stint on Tour, finishing 57th on the money list. He lost in a playoff to Billy Andrade at the Bell Canadian Open and recorded three top-10 finishes. He didn't play as well the following year and had to go through qualifying school to retain his card. In 2000, his final year on the PGA Tour, he struggled and returned to the Nationwide Tour the following year where he would play until 2003.

Friend is the son of the late MLB pitcher Bob Friend (1930–2019), who was a four-time All-Star and 1960 World Series Champion with the Pittsburgh Pirates. He is father to Charles, Libby, and Andrew Friend. He currently works as a real estate agent for Howard Hanna Real Estate in the Fox Chapel area.

Amateur wins
1984 Western Pennsylvania Amateur
1985 Western Pennsylvania Amateur, Pennsylvania Amateur
1986 SEC Championship, Monroe Invitational, Northeast Amateur, Mid-Atlantic Amateur

Professional wins (2)

Nike Tour wins (1)

Nike Tour playoff record (1–1)

Canadian Tour wins (1)
1998 Panama Open

Playoff record
PGA Tour playoff record (0–1)

See also
1991 PGA Tour Qualifying School graduates
1997 PGA Tour Qualifying School graduates
1999 PGA Tour Qualifying School graduates

References

External links

American male golfers
LSU Tigers golfers
PGA Tour golfers
PGA Tour Champions golfers
Golfers from Pittsburgh
Golfers from West Virginia
1963 births
Living people